Eli Rarey is an independent filmmaker based in Detroit. He wrote and directed the feature film The Famous Joe Project which was premiered at Outfest in 2012. His short film by the same name (on which the feature is based) premiered at the 2007 Slamdance Film Festival and won Best International Short Film at the Lisbon Village International Digital Cinema Festival. His interactive feature film on YouTube, Hard Decisions, offers the viewer 11 possible endings. His short film Pigeon, based on the play The Seagull by Anton Chekhov, was nominated for Best Dramatic Short at Berlin Scifi Film Festival. The film stars Zuzanna Szadkowski, who studied theater at Columbia University with Rarey when they were both undergraduates.

Rarey is a founding member of Science Project experimental performance collective. He wrote and performed with them in New York City from 2000 to 2002.

He is a graduate of USC School of Cinematic Arts, where he also taught in the Interactive Media Division.

References

External links 
 Personal website
 

Living people
Year of birth missing (living people)